Fort Wilkinson was a U.S. fort near Milledgeville, Georgia established in 1797 near the Oconee River. It supplanted Fort Fidius. A historical marker commemorates the site. The fort carried out trading relations with Creek peoples through the United States factory.

The marker is located on Fort Wilkinson Road. The 1802 Treaty of Fort Wilkinson deals with relations with the Creek. In 1807, the garrison was moved to Ft. Hawkins on the Ocmulgee River.

References

Populated places in Georgia (U.S. state)